Westside Story is the second mixtape by the Game. It was released on September 28, 2004, through Aftermath Entertainment and was used to promote his forthcoming debut album, The Documentary. It is available for free download at DatPiff.

Track listing

References

2004 albums
The Game (rapper) albums